Temple Glacier is a glacier flowing into the south side of Lanchester Bay on the west coast of Graham Land. Photographed by Hunting Aerosurveys Ltd. in 1955-57 and mapped from these photos by the Falkland Islands Dependencies Survey (FIDS). Named by the United Kingdom Antarctic Place-Names Committee (UK-APC) in 1960 for Félix du Temple de la Croix (1823–1890), French naval officer who in 1857 designed the first powered model airplane to rise unaided, fly freely and land safely.

Glaciers of Davis Coast